Steven Schussler is a developer of theme restaurants and the creator of the Rainforest Cafe. He has created, built and owns T-Rex Cafe, Yak & Yeti Restaurant, Betty & Joe's, Hot Dog Hall of Fame, Galaxy Drive In, Backfire Barbeque, and JukeBox Saturday Night.

Schussler is the author of It’s a Jungle in There, a book chronicling his experience building businesses and providing advice to aspiring entrepreneurs.

It’s A Jungle In There

In 2010 Schussler published It's a Jungle in There: Inspiring Lessons, Hard-Won Insights, and Other Acts of Entrepreneurial Daring, a book intended as inspiration to other entrepreneurs, and donated proceeds to Smile Network International.

Rainforest Cafe

The restaurants are decorated to depict some features of a rainforest, including plant growth, mist, waterfalls, animatronic robots of animals and insects. Large marine aquariums are common in most restaurants. Automated water sprinklers and synchronized lights set to specific patterns are also featured. A simulated thunderstorm occurs every thirty minutes, utilizing simulated rain as well as flashing lights and high-powered subwoofers for lightning and thunder. The restaurants are partitioned into several rooms by means of rain curtains that fall into basins running along the tops of partition walls and booths.

The staff of Rainforest Cafe are named in accordance to the "Safari" theme. Servers are called Safari Guides, Hosts/Hostesses are Tour Guides, Retail Sales Associates are Pathfinders, Bartenders are Navigators, Bussers are Safari Assistants and kitchen staff are named Trailblazers.

The animatronic figures are manufactured by UCFab International, LLC of Apopka, Florida, USA. The star ceilings are designed and manufactured by Fiber Optic Systems Inc, located in Whitehouse Station, New Jersey. Rainforest Cafe restaurants also have a Retail Village, rainforest themed merchandise is sold.

Gallery

References

External links
 Rainforest Café website
 T-Rex Cafe website
 Backfire Barbeque website
 Betty and Joe's website
 Hot Dog Hall of Fame website
 Galaxy Drive In website
 Schussler Creative, Inc. website

Living people
Year of birth missing (living people)
American restaurateurs